Algis "Algy" Vosilaitis (29 January 1943 – 9 April 2017) was an Australian rules footballer who played for the Footscray Football Club in the Victorian Football League (VFL).

References

External links

1943 births
2017 deaths
Australian people of Lithuanian descent
Australian rules footballers from Victoria (Australia)
Western Bulldogs players